The UNC Greensboro baseball team is a varsity intercollegiate athletic team of University of North Carolina at Greensboro in Greensboro, North Carolina, United States. The team is a member of the Southern Conference, which is part of the National Collegiate Athletic Association's Division I.  The team plays its home games at UNCG Baseball Stadium in Greensboro, North Carolina.

See also
List of NCAA Division I baseball programs

References

External links
 

Baseball teams established in 1991
1991 establishments in North Carolina